Joseph Michael Morgan (born November 19, 1930) is an American retired infielder, manager, coach and scout in Major League Baseball.

Early life
A native and lifelong resident of Walpole, Massachusetts, Morgan graduated from Walpole High School and attended Boston College, where he played varsity hockey—he was a center who led the Eagles in points as a junior—as well as baseball. Morgan was also elected as team captain for Boston College's baseball team during his junior year.  He signed his first professional baseball contract on June 20, 1952, with his then-hometown National League team, the Boston Braves.

Playing career

A left-handed-hitting second baseman, third baseman and outfielder, Morgan batted over the .300 mark three times in the high minors between 1956 and 1959. He could not, however, crack the Braves' lineup, nor those of the Philadelphia Phillies, Kansas City Athletics, Cleveland Indians and St. Louis Cardinals. In parts of four Major League seasons, he appeared in 88 games, collected 36 hits, and batted .193. His two MLB home runs came during his stint with the 1960 Indians within a two-week period, as he hit solo shots off Chuck Estrada August 30 and Ted Sadowski on September 10. In the latter contest, Morgan's three hits and two runs scored helped the Indians to a 5–4 victory over the Washington Senators.

In 13 seasons in the minor leagues, Morgan had 1,353 hits (with 117 home runs) and compiled a lifetime batting mark of .278. He was named Most Valuable Player of the Triple-A International League in 1964 after batting .290 with 16 home runs for the Jacksonville Suns.

Managerial career

Pittsburgh Pirates' organization
In 1966, Morgan became a manager in the farm system of the Pittsburgh Pirates, rising in 1970 to Triple-A with the Columbus Jets of the International League. In 1971, he moved with the Jets to Charleston, West Virginia, and became skipper of the Charleston Charlies.

Morgan then returned to the minors as the Pirates' Triple-A manager. In 1973, his Charlies won 85 games and the division title, but lost in the International League playoffs to the Pawtucket Red Sox in five games. Nevertheless, Morgan was selected Minor League Manager of the Year for 1973 by The Sporting News.

Pawtucket Red Sox
Morgan joined the Boston Red Sox organization the following season. He led the PawSox—located 24 miles (38 km) from his Walpole hometown—for nine years (1974–82), the longest-tenured manager in the franchise's history. He won the International League Manager of the Year Award in 1977.

Boston Red Sox

In , a Boston team was at one game over .500 under manager John McNamara, leading the ownership to fire him during the All-Star break. They named Morgan acting manager July 14 and began negotiations with high-profile candidates, such as Joe Torre and Lou Piniella, who were under contract to other organizations. The Red Sox won their first 12 games under Morgan – a period dubbed by the press as Morgan Magic – and the team named him as their permanent field boss. The 1988 Red Sox won the AL East, but were swept by the Oakland Athletics in the American League Championship Series; two years later, the 1990 Sox repeated history, winning their division but bowing in four straight to the A's in the playoffs. Collectively, the Red Sox were 0-8 in the post season under Morgan, an American League record.
      
In , Morgan guided a Boston team to a second-place finish in the AL East. The team had difficulties in June and July before maneuvering their way back in early September; as late as the 21st, they were just a half game behind Toronto in the East. However, they lost 11 of their last 14 games and finished seven games behind Toronto. Although he had one year remaining on his contract, he was fired at season's end in favor of Butch Hobson. Under Hobson, the 1992 Red Sox finished last in the AL East.

Morgan's final big league managerial totals: 301–262 (.535) over  years, all with the Red Sox. His record as a minor league manager over 16 seasons (1966–71; 1973–82) was 1,140 victories and 1,102 defeats (.508) with one league championship (with the York Pirates of the Double-A Eastern League in 1969).

Managerial record

Popularity
Morgan was called "Walpole Joe," as well as "Turnpike Joe" in tribute to the offseason job he held for many years to supplement his minor league pay: driving a snowplow on the Massachusetts Turnpike. The nicknames also served to prevent any confusion with Baseball Hall of Fame second baseman Joe Morgan. His phrases became part of New England folklore, such as "I'm the skipper of this nine!", and "Roger spun another beauty", describing one of the outings by his star pitcher, Roger Clemens.

In 2006, he was named to the Boston Red Sox Hall of Fame and the Walpole High School Hockey Hall of Fame. Morgan was inducted into the International League Hall of Fame in 2008. On July 30, 2013, the Red Sox honored him with "Joe Morgan Night" at Fenway Park, with Clemens among the former players participating in the festivities.

References

External links
, or Retrosheet

1930 births
Living people
Atlanta Crackers players
Baseball coaches from Massachusetts
Baseball players from Massachusetts
Boston College Eagles baseball players
Boston College Eagles men's ice hockey players
Boston Red Sox coaches
Boston Red Sox managers
Boston Red Sox scouts
Charleston Marlins players
Cleveland Indians players
Evansville Braves players
Hartford Chiefs players
International League MVP award winners
Jacksonville Braves players
Jacksonville Suns players
Kansas City Athletics players
Louisville Colonels (minor league) players
Major League Baseball bullpen coaches
Major League Baseball first base coaches
Major League Baseball third base coaches
Major League Baseball third basemen
Milwaukee Braves players
Pawtucket Red Sox managers
People from Walpole, Massachusetts
Philadelphia Phillies players
Pittsburgh Pirates coaches
Raleigh Pirates players
Rapiños de Occidente players
St. Louis Cardinals players
San Juan Marlins players
Wichita Braves players